The 6th Asian Games were held from 9 to 20 December 1970 in Bangkok, Thailand. Seoul, South Korea, had been selected to host the 6th Games but it declined due to both financial reasons and security threats from neighboring North Korea. (The city eventually hosted in 1986). The previous host, Thailand, stepped in to save the Asiad. 2,400 athletes from 18 countries competed in this Asiad, where yachting made its debut.

Venue

National Sport Complex
 Suphachalasai Stadium (Opening & Closing ceremonies, Athletics and Football)
 Chantanayingyong Gymnasium (Volleyball)
 Dhephatsadin Stadium (Hockey)
 Nimibutr Indoor Stadium (Basketball)
 Wisutarom Swimming Pool (Diving, Swimming)

Sport Authority of Thailand Sport Complex (Hua Mark)
 Indoor Stadium (formerly Kittikachorn Indoor Stadium) (Badminton and Boxing)
 Shooting Range (Shooting)
 Velodrome (Cycling)

Chulalongkorn University Sport Complex
 Chula Football Stadium (Football)
 Chula Swimming Stadium (Water Polo)

Thammasat University (Thaprachan Centre)
 Thammasat Gymnasium (Volleyball)

Other Venue in Bangkok
 Cultural Hall (Weightlifting)
 Amporn Garden Hall (Wrestling)

Pattaya (Outside Bangkok)
 Pattaya Bay (Sailing)

Participating nations

Non-competing nations
The following only sent non-competing delegations:

Sports

Calendar
In the following calendar for the 1970 Asian Games, each blue box represents an event competition, such as a qualification round, on that day. The yellow boxes represent days during which medal-awarding finals for a sport were held. The numeral indicates the number of event finals for each sport held that day. On the left, the calendar lists each sport with events held during the Games, and at the right, how many gold medals were won in that sport. There is a key at the top of the calendar to aid the reader.

Medal table

The top ten ranked NOCs at these Games are listed below. The host nation, Thailand, is highlighted.

References

External links
OCA Website

 
Asian Games
Asian Games
Asian Games
Asian Games
Asian Games
Summer
Asian Games by year
Asian Games